A graviton is a hypothetical gauge boson of a quantum theory of gravitation.

Graviton may also refer to:

 Graviton (comics), a supervillain in Marvel Comics
 Graviton City, a fictional city in the Project A-ko anime which includes a school of the same name
 AWS Graviton, a series of processors developed by Annapurna Labs for use in data centers

See also
 Gravitron, an amusement ride
 Gravitonas, a Swedish rock band